University of Algiers Brahim Soltane Chaibout, commonly called the Algiers 3 University, is an Algerian public university located in Dely Ibrahim (Algiers Province) in the north of the country.

It was established in accordance with Executive Decree No. 09-341 of 22 October 2009 after the division of the University of Algiers to three universities (University of Algiers 1, University of Algiers 2 and University of Algiers 3).

Faculty and Institutes 
The faculties and institute of the University of Algiers 3 are as follows:
 Faculty of Economics and Management;
 Faculty of Political Science and International Relations;
 Faculty of Information and Communication Sciences;
 Institute of Physical Education and Sport.

References

External links
 Official website

2009 establishments in Algeria
Algiers
Buildings and structures in Algiers